The following is a summary of Donegal county football team's 2016 season.

The 'KN Group' began appearing as title sponsor on the front of player shirts, while the 'MCR Group' became Tier 2 sponsors, thus featuring on the back of player shirts. Goalkeeping coach was James Gallagher.

Personnel changes
Brendan Kilcoyne replaced Gary McDaid on the management team.

Twelve players were added ahead of the season: Eoghan Bán Gallagher, Ciarán Thompson, Stephen McMenamin, Caolan McGonagle, Tony McClenaghan, Kieran Gillespie (Gaoth Dobhair), Michael Carroll, Stephen McBrearty, Jack O'Brien, Danny Rodgers (Dungloe; goalkeeper), Rory Carr (St Eunan's) and Caolan Ward. Ward was the eldest of those additions. O'Brien played for Donegal in the 2016 National Football League semi-final against Dublin at Croke Park.

Paul Durcan emigrated to Qatar at the end of the previous season.

Competitions

Dr McKenna Cup

National Football League Division 1

The fixtures were announced on 16 November 2015.

Table

Reports

Ulster Senior Football Championship

The draw for the 2016 Ulster Senior Football Championship took place on 15 October 2015.

Bracket

Reports

All-Ireland Senior Football Championship

Management team
Strength and conditioning coach: Paul Fisher

Awards

All Stars
Ryan McHugh won an All Star, the county's 32nd. Paddy McGrath and Patrick McBrearty were also nominated.

County breakdown
 Dublin = 6
 Mayo = 4
 Tyrone = 2
 Donegal = 1
 Kerry = 1
 Tipperary = 1

References

Donegal
Donegal county football team seasons